Jeevitha Nouka (English: The Boat of Life) is an Indian Malayalam television series  premiered on Mazhavil Manorama since 23 March 2020 and streams on Manorama Max. The show was produced by Suresh Unnithan 's Sree Movies. Popular actor Sajan Surya alongside Nithin Jake Joseph played the lead characters.

Plot
Jeevitha Nouka takes a deep dive into the depths of relationships. It is an unforgettable lesson on overcoming the struggles of life while keeping your loved ones close. The depth of brotherhood shared between Jayakrishnan and Harikrishnan is ruined when Meghna Reddy enters the Palakkal House as Hari's wife. The twist, Meghna is actually Jayan's first wife Aswathy, who was kidnapped by Jayan's father Nadesan after realizing that she was pregnant with Jayan's child.Nadesan hated her since she was from a poor family. When Jayan went to Singapore for higher studies,Nadesan killed Aswathy's father in front of her own eyes and then kidnapped and tortured her. When she gave birth to a baby girl, Nadesan took the baby away from her and told her that he had killed the baby. Believing that Jayan betrayed her, Aswathy has returned as Meghna to take revenge, with the help of her guardian Swamiji. Jayan is tensed as his current wife Sumithra and the rest of the family do not know anything about Aswathy. The story moves forward as Meghna proceeds with her revenge and one by one the members of Palakkal family realize the truth. Finally, Meghna realizes that her daughter is in fact alive, and she is Malu, the adopted daughter of Jayan and Sumithra. She also realizes that Jayan is innocent. The story ends with Meghna committing suicide after killing Swamiji, while Jayan, Sumithra and Malu live happily ever after.

Cast

Main cast
Sajan Surya as  Palakkal Jayakrishnan
Anjana KR as Sumithra Jayakrishnan
Win Sagar (episode 1-35) / Nithin Jake Joseph ( episode 40-223) as Palakkal Harikrishnan 
Jishin Mohan as Sudhi
Maneesha Jayasingh as Meghna Reddy / Aswathy
Subhash Nair as Arakkapparambil Prabhakaran, Priyanka's father
Aswathy U Pillai(episode 1-20) / Anjusha(episode 21-35) / Pinky Kannan ( episode 36-223) as Priyanka

Recurring cast
Karthika Kannan as Soudhamini, Nadesan's sister
Anil K Sivaram as Palakkal Nadesan, Jayan and Hari's father
Hariprashanth M.G as Karadippara Thampi, Sumithra's brother
Kris Venugopal as Guruji
Larry as Parameshwaran
Krishnapriya as Meenakshi
Vineetha Devadas
Benny as Panchayath President
Disney James as Murali, Soudamini's husband and Forest officer
Jayakrishnan Narayan as Raghavan, Aswathy's father
Ashwathy
Ambika Mohan as Jaya-Hari's mother (Photo only)

Airing History
The series was launched on 23 March 2020 at 7.00PM IST.The show was taken off the air abruptly due to the COVID-19 pandemic lockdown in India in March 2020. Later, it was relaunched on 1 June swapping the timings with Manjil Virinja Poovu to 7.30 PM IST.Due to low TRP the show was pushed down to 6.30PM IST. On 26 March 2021 the show went off air.

References

Malayalam-language television shows
2020 Indian television series debuts
Mazhavil Manorama original programming